Polje pri Višnji Gori is a settlement southeast of Višnja Gora in the historical Lower Carniola region in central Slovenia. It belongs to the Municipality of Ivančna Gorica, which is included in the Central Slovenia Statistical Region.

Name
The name of the settlement was changed from Polje to Polje pri Višnji Gori in 1953. In the past the German name was Feld.

Cultural heritage

There is a chapel-shrine in Polje pri Višnji Gori dedicated to the Virgin Mary. It stands in the northwest part of the village and dates to the late 19th century. The shrine has a niche in the gable and a small tower, and it houses a statue of the Virgin Mary.

Notable people
Notable people that were born or lived in Polje pri Višnji Gori include:
 France Lokar (1917–1994), priest and poet, born in Polje pri Višnji Gori

References

External links
Polje pri Višnji Gori on Geopedia

Populated places in the Municipality of Ivančna Gorica